Idgah Bus Station is the biggest bus station in Agra. The Bus Stand is in Idgah Colony. The bus stand is very close to both the Idgah Railway Station as well as the Agra Cantt, which is the main railway Station in Agra. 

Uttar Pradesh State Road Transport Corporation (UPSRTC)  operates hi-tech, deluxe, semi-deluxe and ordinary buses from here.

Destinations
List of major destinations for which buses are available from Idgah Bus Stand are
Delhi
Jaipur 
Mathura
Kanpur
Lucknow
Fatehpur Sikri
Gwalior
Jhansi
chandigarh
Bareilly

See also
 Railways in Agra

External links
Uttar Pradesh State Road Transport Corporation
http://www.india9.com/i9show/Idgah-Bus-Station-50862.htm

Bus stations in Uttar Pradesh
Transport in Agra
Buildings and structures in Agra